The 2018 Meridian Canadian Open was held from January 16–21 at the Encana Arena in Camrose, Alberta. This was the fourth Grand Slam of Curling event and third "major" of the 2017–18 curling season.

In the Men's final Peter de Cruz and his team from Geneva, Switzerland won their first Grand Slam title and the first by a Swiss men's team. They also became just the third non-Canadian team to win a Grand Slam as they defeated Niklas Edin. This marked the second straight Grand Slam event in which two non-Canadian men's teams contested the final.

In the Women's final Chelsea Carey and her rink from Calgary won their first Grand Slam title of the season, the second of Carey's career, as they defeated Michelle Englot who was looking to win her first Grand Slam title since 2008.

Men

Teams

Knockout Draw Brackets

A Event

B event

C Event

Playoffs

Quarterfinals

Semifinals

Finals

Women

Teams

A Event

B Event

C Event

Playoffs

Quarterfinals

Semifinals

Finals

Notes

References

External links

2018
January 2018 sports events in Canada
2018 in Canadian curling
Sport in Camrose, Alberta
2018 in Alberta
Curling in Alberta